Daniel Morais Reis (born 12 May 1986) is a Brazilian former professional footballer who played as a forward.

Career
Morais Reis joined Allsvenskan club GAIS in the beginning of 2008 from Belo Horizonte club América FC. He and the club agreed on terminating the contract in September 2009.

After the good passage for União Araxá, from Araxá, Brazil, in the first half of 2012, Morais Reis joined with Uberaba Sport, from Uberaba, to play on the Taça Minas championship. Uberaba won the Taça Minas championship for three times. He scored four goals in the three last matches for Uberaba.

References

External links
 
 Profile at svenskfotboll.se

1986 births
Living people
Brazilian footballers
Association football forwards
GAIS players
América Futebol Clube (MG) players
Brazilian expatriate footballers
Brazilian expatriate sportspeople in Sweden
Expatriate footballers in Sweden